Goldsworthy may refer to:

 Adrian Goldsworthy, a British historian and novelist who specialises in ancient Roman history

Places
Goldsworthy, Western Australia, a former mining town in the Shire of East Pilbara, Australia
Goldsworthy Ridge, a ridge extending north from Mount Henderson in Mac. Robertson Land, Antarctica
Goldsworthy, Gwennap, Cornwall, United Kingdom
Goldsworthy, Crowan, Cornwall, United Kingdom

Other uses
 Goldsworthy (name)
Goldsworthy Productions, a short lived Australian production company established by actor Reg Goldsworthy
Goldsworthy railway, an iron ore railway line in Australia operated by BHP

See also